Reggie Perrin is a modern update of the 1970s BBC sitcom The Fall and Rise of Reginald Perrin, which starred Leonard Rossiter. The revival stars Martin Clunes and was first broadcast on 24 April 2009. Series 1 was released on DVD in Region 2 by 2entertain on 1 June 2009. The second series was released on 22 November 2010.

Development
On 14 January 2009, it was announced by the BBC that Martin Clunes would star in a contemporary version of the sitcom, taking the title role of Reggie. The remake was commissioned by Jay Hunt, controller of BBC1, and Cheryl Taylor, controller of BBC Comedy. Clunes was joined in the cast by Fay Ripley, Wendy Craig, Geoffrey Whitehead, Neil Stuke, Kerry Howard, Jim Howick and Lucy Liemann. The new version was written by Simon Nye and the original creator of the Reggie character, David Nobbs, who had authored four Reginald Perrin novels as well as the original version of the sitcom.

The first series of the Reggie Perrin revival was broadcast on BBC One, as well as in high definition on BBC HD. Despite disappointing viewing figures for its first series, BBC1 Controller Jay Hunt announced in February 2010 that a second series had been commissioned. Studio segments began filming at Teddington Studios on 2 April, scheduled to run to 7 May. It began airing on 14 October 2010.

Plot
Reginald Perrin is a middle-aged project executive for "Groomtech", a manufacturer of grooming products, where he is in charge of disposable razors. Although secure in his marriage, with a paid-for house, no children, a car and a comfortable living, he is dissatisfied with the grind of modern living—such as his daily commute by train, often overcrowded and "27 minutes late" due to a plethora of reasons—and undergoing a mid-life crisis, keeping himself entertained by fantasies. At work, he has to contend with a dim secretary, two fawning but ambitious junior executives, and an overbearing boss, Chris Jackson. Lacking attention from his wife, Nicola, he finds a fantasy distraction in his colleague, Jasmine Strauss.  The plot of series one roughly parallels the storyline of the original, however the new series diverges when Reggie decides to fake his own suicide.

Episodes

Series 1

Series 2

Reception
John Preston of The Daily Telegraph was negative, describing it as "hopelessly wheezy and club-footed. Part of the problem was that while the script may have been updated, everything else had large tufts of mammoth hair stuck to it: the cheap sets, the laboured direction, the glaringly unatmospheric lighting, the once-daring surrealistic touches, even the concept itself."

Caitlin Moran of The Times was more positive, saying "I actually like this new one. It gently warmed me. It warmed me as As Time Goes By warms me" and praising Clunes's interpretation: "I engage with the escalating depression and insanity of Clunes's Perrin more than I did with Rossiter's..."

References

External links

2009 British television series debuts
2010 British television series endings
2000s British sitcoms
2010s British sitcoms
BBC high definition shows
BBC television sitcoms
Television series by All3Media
English-language television shows
Television shows shot at Teddington Studios